Interstate 77 (I-77) in Ohio is an Interstate Highway that runs for  through the state. The highway crosses into Ohio on the Marietta–Williamstown Interstate Bridge over the Ohio River near Marietta. The northern terminus is in Cleveland at the junction with I-90.

Route description
Entering from West Virginia at Marietta via the Marietta–Williamstown Interstate Bridge, I-77 passes through rolling Appalachian terrain.

Other major Interstate Highways I-77 connects with in Ohio are I-76, I-80 (Ohio Turnpike), and I-90. The interchange with the Ohio Turnpike was completed December 3, 2001, providing direct access; previously, traffic had to exit at State Route 21 (SR 21) to get to the Turnpike.

I-77 is also known as the "Vietnam Veterans Memorial Highway" in Ohio, and the Willow Freeway in Greater Cleveland.

History

Planned route
Originally planned to run from Port Huron, Michigan, to Charlotte, North Carolina, I-77 appeared on the original Interstate System route numbering plan in 1957. The part of I-94 from Detroit, Michigan, northeast to Port Huron was originally planned as I-77 in 1957; the current I-77 was I-79. When the current I-79 was added in Pennsylvania, the I-77 designation was moved to its current route, but the I-77 in Michigan also remained in the 1958 numbering plan, so the designation followed I-90 and I-75 in order to keep it continuous; the designation north of I-77's westward turn was to have been Interstate 177 (I-177). I-77 in Michigan later became part of I-94.

Initially, US Route 21 (US 21) traveled from Marietta to Cleveland. In 1962, I-77 debuted in Akron and Canton. Soon, it drastically grew in the process as time went on. By the end of 1971, US 21 was decommissioned in Ohio in favor of I-77 which was nearly complete. It was eventually finished in 1976 with the final connection being opened in Independence.

Exit list

Auxiliary routes
Interstate 277 is a spur route in Akron connecting I-77 to I-76.

References

External links

 
77
Transportation in Washington County, Ohio
Transportation in Noble County, Ohio
Transportation in Guernsey County, Ohio
Transportation in Tuscarawas County, Ohio
Transportation in Stark County, Ohio
Transportation in Summit County, Ohio
Transportation in Cuyahoga County, Ohio